Abrishami Synagogue ( Kanise ye Abrishami) is a synagogue in Tehran, Iran. It was built in September 1965 in the upper-middle-class neighborhood of Kakh Shomali (currently N. Palestine Street). The land on which the synagogue-school compound was built was granted by the Iranian Jewish philanthropist, Aghajan Abrishami and is 1,025 square meters (approximately 11,040 square feet) in size.  A foundation was originally created by the name of Tzedek Cultural Foundation whose mission was to oversee the building and operations of the Abrishami Synagogue-School Compound.  The founding members of the foundation were:  Aghajan Abrishami, Nasser Akhtarzad, David Berukhim, Menashe Purat, Benjamin Shaban, Mehdi Musazadeh, Habib Lavi, (Hacham) Abdollah Netan Eli and Musa Nassir.

The compound consists of two floors.  The first floor is a school and the second floor houses Abrishami Synagogue.  The building was constructed in a modernist 1960s architectural style.

Abrishami Synagogue serves as the social and cultural center of the Jewish community of Tehran and is administered directly by the Chief Rabbinate.  The Chief Rabbi of Iran, Yousef Hamadani Cohen died March 29, 2014.

See also
History of the Jews in Iran
List of synagogues in Iran

References

Synagogues in Tehran
Judaism in Persia and Iran
Orthodox Judaism in the Middle East